Point Grenville is a headland of Washington state. The point was named Punta de los Mártires ("Point of the Martyrs") during the 1775 expedition of Bruno de Heceta in response to an attack by the local Quinault Indians.
This site is sacred to the Quinault and was developed to host the 2013 Paddle to Quinault.

References

External links

Landforms of Grays Harbor County, Washington
Grenville